A folly is a decorative building. The term was also once used for a circular plantation or tree ring.

Folly most often also refers to:
 Foolishness, the lack of wisdom
 Folly fort, a military fort built on water near a shore

Folly may also refer to:

Arts and entertainment
 Folly (allegory), a common allegorical figure in medieval morality plays and in allegorical artwork through the Renaissance
 Folly (band), a band from Sussex, New Jersey
 Folly, an 1886 statue by Edward Onslow Ford
 Folly, a 1994 novel by Susan Minot

Places

New Zealand
 Folly Island, New Zealand, in the Campbell Island group

United States
 Folly, Virginia, an unincorporated community
 Folly (Staunton, Virginia), a historic plantation house
 Folly Island, a barrier island near Charleston, South Carolina

Rivers in England
 Folly Brook, Barnet, London
 Folly Brook, a tributary of the River Frome, Bristol
 Folly Brook, a tributary of the River Clun, Shropshire

Other uses
 Folly (color), a color one-fourth of the way between crimson and rose, closer to crimson than to rose
 , a sailing schooner that served in the United States Navy as a patrol vessel during World War I
 Yoann Folly (born 1985), French-born Togolese football player

See also 
 Seward's Folly, another name for the purchase of Alaska
 Folie (disambiguation)
 Follies (disambiguation)
 Foley (disambiguation)
 FoLLI